The Canon de 75 mle GP II was a field gun used by Belgium during World War II. Cockerill mounted lengthened Canon de 75 mle TR barrels on ex-German 7.7 cm FK 16 gun carriages received as reparations after World War I.  After 1940, the Wehrmacht designated captured guns as the 7.5 cm FK 234(b) and used them to equip occupation units in Belgium.

References 

 Chamberlain, Peter & Gander, Terry. Light and Medium Field Artillery. New York: Arco, 1975
 Gander, Terry and Chamberlain, Peter. Weapons of the Third Reich: An Encyclopedic Survey of All Small Arms, Artillery and Special Weapons of the German Land Forces 1939-1945. New York: Doubleday, 1979 

World War II field artillery
World War II artillery of Belgium
75 mm artillery